Sir John Simeon, 1st Baronet (1756 – 4 February 1824) of Walliscot in Oxfordshire was Member of Parliament (MP) for Reading in Berkshire from 1797 to 1802 and from 1806 to 1818. He also practised as barrister and a member of Lincoln's Inn, and held the offices of Recorder of Reading 1779-1807 and Master in Chancery from 1795 until 1808 when he became Senior Master, and was created 1st Baronet Simeon in 1815.

Simeon was the second eldest son of Richard Simeon (died 1784) and Elizabeth Hutton. His elder brother, named Richard after their father, died early. The third brother, Edward Simeon, was a director of the Bank of England. His youngest brother, Charles Simeon, became a prominent evangelical clergyman.

Family

John Simeon married Rebecca Cornwall, daughter of John Cornwall of Hendon House in Middlesex, in 1783. They had a number of children:
 Richard Godin Simeon (21 May 1784 – 11 January 1855) married Louisa Edith Barrington (1790–1847) on 8 April 1813, producing three sons and two daughters
Harriet Simeon (died 15 November 1845) married Sir Frederick Francis Baker, 2nd Baronet in July 1814, producing 1 daughter and 3 sons.
Edward Simeon (1788 - 16 October 1851) on 3 September 1814 married Sophia Charlotte Lybbe-Powys of Hardwick House (2 July 1796 – 23 February 1833)
Charlotte Simeon (died 1845)
Eleanora Simeon
Charles Simeon

Notes

References

1756 births
1824 deaths
Members of the Parliament of Great Britain for English constituencies
British MPs 1796–1800
Members of the Parliament of the United Kingdom for English constituencies
UK MPs 1801–1802
UK MPs 1806–1807
UK MPs 1807–1812
UK MPs 1812–1818
Baronets in the Baronetage of the United Kingdom
Members of Lincoln's Inn
People from Oxfordshire (before 1974)
Members of the Parliament of Great Britain for Reading
Members of the Parliament of the United Kingdom for Reading
John